

Gmina Łobez is an urban-rural gmina (administrative district) in Łobez County, West Pomeranian Voivodeship, in north-western Poland.

Villages
Apart from the town of Łobez, Gmina Łobez contains the villages and settlements of Bełczna, Bonin, Budziszcze, Byszewo, Dalno, Dobieszewo, Grabowo, Karwowo, Klępnica, Kołdrąb, Łobżany, Meszne, Niegrzebia, Polakowo, Pomorzany, Poradz, Prusinowo, Przyborze, Rożnowo Łobeskie, Rynowo, Rynowo-Kolonia, Suliszewice, Tarnowo, Trzeszczyna, Unimie, Worowo, Wysiedle, Zachełmie, Zagórzyce, Zajezierze, Zakrzyce and Zdzisławice.

Neighbouring gminas
Gmina Łobez is bordered by the gminas of Brzeżno, Drawsko Pomorskie, Radowo Małe, Resko, Świdwin and Węgorzyno.

References
 Polish official population figures 2014. Główny Urząd Statystyczny. Baza Demografia. Stan i struktura ludności, dane na dzień 31.03.2014  

Lobez
Gmina Lobez